Scrobipalpa spumata is a moth in the family Gelechiidae. It was described by Povolný in 2001. It is found in Russia (the southern Ural Mountains and the Tuva Republic).

References

Scrobipalpa
Moths described in 2001